The Pulpit Commentary is a homiletic commentary on the Bible created during the nineteenth century under the direction of Rev. Joseph S. Exell and Henry Donald Maurice Spence-Jones. It consists of 23 volumes with 22,000 pages and 95,000 entries, and was written over a 30-year period with 100 contributors.

Rev. Joseph S. Exell M.A. served as the editor of Clerical World, The Homiletical Quarterly and the Monthly Interpreter. Exell was also the editor for several other large commentary sets like The Men of the Bible, The Preacher's Homiletic Library and The Biblical Illustrator. Henry Donald Maurice Spence-Jones was the Vicar and Rural Dean of St. Pancras, London and the principal of Gloucester Theological College.

External links
 StudyLight.org provides an online version here.
 The whole text is downloadable at  thepulpitcommentary.blogspot.co.uk, and is also available at biblehub.com or e-sword.net for free, if one downloads the e-sword application.

References

Biblical commentaries